The Tower Petroleum Building (also known as The Tower Building) is a historic Art Deco Skyscraper located at 1907 Elm Street in the City Center District of Downtown Dallas. The tower, a contributing property in the Dallas Downtown Historic District and the Harwood Street Historic District, features Zig-zag Moderne styling and was designed by architect Mark Lemmon.

Design
The Tower Petroleum Building features Zig-zag Moderne motifs, one of the few buildings left in Downtown Dallas which features such designs.  The building's facade is clad in limestone and has green spandrels panels between the windows. The upper floors of the building are set back twice from the shaft of the building starting with a three-story set back from the 19th floor.  At the 22nd floor, the top sets back again and this section is 2 stories in height.  These setbacks occur on three sides of the building.

History
The Tower Petroleum Building is located in the city's historic entertainment district, Theater Row; the adjacent Majestic Theatre is the only surviving theater. At one time, the Tower Theater was located behind the building and the lobby to that theater was located inside the office building. In 1951, the Corrigan Tower was constructed over and around the Tower Theater.
The Federal Bureau of Investigation had offices on the 12th floor of the Tower Petroleum Building from 1937 to 1943.

Adaptive reuse
In June 2007, the Dallas City Council approved a $15 million plan by a local developer to renovate and convert the Tower Petroleum Building into a luxury high-rise hotel.
In 2018, Developer John Kirtland completed a 52 million dollar substantial renovation of the tower Petroleum. The Saint Elm Hotel (Marriott) is a 177 Key Hotel operating in the Petroleum Tower.

See also

Eliel Saarinen's Tribune Tower design
National Register of Historic Places listings in Dallas County, Texas
List of Dallas Landmarks

References

External links
Tower Petroleum Building - Dallas Architecture

Office buildings completed in 1931
Art Deco architecture in Texas
Skyscraper office buildings in Dallas